Papyrius flavus is a species of ant in the genus Papyrius. Endemic to Australia, it was described by Mayr in 1865.

References

Dolichoderinae
Hymenoptera of Australia
Insects described in 1865